Men and Women is the second album by British pop and soul group Simply Red, released in 1987.

Singles
Five singles were released from the album. "The Right Thing" was the first to be released, peaking at number 11 in the UK Singles Chart. "Infidelity" was the second single, which reached number 31, followed by "Maybe Someday..." which became Simply Red's first single to fail to reach the UK top 75, peaking at number 88. The next single, "Ev'ry Time We Say Goodbye", a cover of the Cole Porter song, returned the band to the top 20 where it peaked at number 11. "I Won’t Feel Bad" was the fifth and final single from the album, peaking at number 68.

Track listing

2008 Collector's Edition bonus tracks

Personnel 
Simply Red
 Mick Hucknall – lead and backing vocals
 Fritz McIntyre – keyboards, backing vocals
 Tim Kellett – keyboards, trumpet, flugelhorn, percussion, live backing vocals
 Sylvan Richardson – guitars
 Tony Bowers – bass, percussion 
 Chris Joyce – drums, percussion

Additional musicians
 Steve Rainford – keyboard programming
 Ian Kirkham – baritone saxophone, tenor saxophone 
 Derek Wadsworth – trombone on "Love Fire"
 Eleanor Morris – cello on "Ev'ry Time We Say Goodbye"
 Janette Sewell – backing vocals

Production 
 Alex Sadkin – producer (1-4, 6-10), mixing (1-4, 6-10)
 Mick Hucknall – producer (5)
 Yvonne Ellis – producer (5), engineer (5)
 Barry Mraz – engineer (1-4, 6-10), mixing (1-4, 7)
 Chris Dickie – assistant engineer (1–5, 7, 10), mixing (1-4, 7)
 Simon Sullivan – assistant engineer (6, 8, 9)
 Kevin Whyte – assistant engineer (6, 8, 9)
 Colin Andrews – assistant engineer (10)
 Joe Barbaria – mixing (6, 8, 9)
 Nick Launay – mixing (6, 8, 9)
 Ted Jensen – mastering
 Robert Erdmann – photography
 Paul Smith – clothes
 Representation:
Worldwide – So What Arts Ltd
USA – In association with Burton Management

Studios
 Recorded at Yellow 2 Studios (Stockport, UK).
 Tracks 1–4 & 7 mixed at RAK Studios (London, UK); Track 5 mixed at Yellow 2 Studios; Tracks 6, 8 & 9 mixed at Mayfair Studios (London, UK); Track 10 mixed at Utopia Studios (London, UK).
 Mastered at Sterling Sound (New York, NY, USA).

Charts

Weekly charts

Year-end charts

Certifications and sales

}

}

References

Bibliography

 

Elektra Records albums
1987 albums
Simply Red albums
Albums produced by Alex Sadkin